Latangi (pronounced latāngi) is a ragam in Carnatic music (musical scale of South Indian classical music). It is the 63rd Melakarta rāgam in the 72 melakarta rāgam system of Carnatic music. It is called Geetapriya or Gitapriya in the Muthuswami Dikshitar school of Carnatic music.

Structure and Lakshana

It is the 3rd rāgam in the 11th chakra Rudra. The mnemonic name is Rudra-Go. The mnemonic phrase is sa ri gu mi pa dha nu. Its  structure (ascending and descending scale) is as follows (see swaras in Carnatic music for details on below notation and terms):
: 
: 
(the notes used in this scale are chathusruthi rishabham, antara gandharam, prati madhyamam, shuddha dhaivatham, kakali nishadham)

As it is a melakarta rāgam, by definition it is a sampoorna rāgam (has all seven notes in ascending and descending scale). It is the prati madhyamam equivalent of Sarasangi, which is the 27th melakarta.

Janya rāgams 
Latangi has a few minor janya rāgams (derived scales) associated with it. See List of janya rāgams for full list of rāgams associated with Latangi.

Compositions 
Here are a few common compositions sung in concerts, set to Latangi.

Diname sudhinamu by Thyagaraja
Aparadhamula by Thyagaraja
Marivere and Aparadamulan by Patnam Subramania Iyer
Pirava varam tharum by Papanasam Sivan
Venkataramana by Papanasam Sivan
Srilalithe Srikanthasahite by Jayachamarajendra Wodeyar
Tamralochani Latangi by Dr. M. Balamuralikrishna
Konjum Salangai Tigazhum Varnam by Madurai R. Muralidaran

Related rāgams 
This section covers the theoretical and scientific aspect of this rāgam.

Latangi's notes when shifted using Graha bhedam, yields 2 other melakarta rāgams, namely, Sooryakantam and Senavati. Graha bhedam is the step taken in keeping the relative note frequencies same, while shifting the shadjam to the next note in the rāgam. For further details and an illustration refer Graha bhedam on Sooryakantam.

Film Songs

Language:Tamil

Notes

References

Melakarta ragas